Raymond "Mong" de Vera Palatino (born December 19, 1979) is a Filipino writer, journalist, politician, and activist. He represented Kabataan (Youth) Party in the 14th and 15th Congress of the Philippines. He is currently the secretary-general of BAYAN Metro Manila. As a writer, he was a contributor for Tinig, Yehey! and UPI-Asia. He is currently the Southeast Asia editor for Global Voices, contributor to ASEAN Beat and The Diplomat, Bulatlat, Manila Today, and New Mandala.

Palatino became a member of the House of Representatives following the decision of the Philippine Supreme Court declaring the entitlement of Kabataan Party to a seat in the House of Representatives. A graduate of education from the University of the Philippines Diliman, Palatino was active in student politics. He was chairperson of the college student council in 1999.  A year after that, he was elected as chairperson of the University Student Council. He joined Global Voices Online In June 2006 and he is currently the regional editor for Southeast Asia.

In 2001, Palatino was elected as the national president of the National Union of Students of the Philippines (NUSP), the biggest alliance of student councils and governments in the Philippines.

Palatino was one of the convenors of different broad youth formations, including the Estrada Resign Youth Movement (ERYM), Youth Action Network (YAN), Filipino Youth for Peace, Kabataan Kontra-Kartel (Youth Against the Oil Cartel), and TxtPower. Palatino was awarded by the United Nations Association of the Philippines (UNAP) for "youth empowerment on national concerns".

References

External links
 Mong Palatino's website

Living people
Party-list members of the House of Representatives of the Philippines
Filipino activists
University of the Philippines Diliman alumni
1979 births